Vinyl FM is a Swedish radio station founded in September 1994. Vinyl FM focuses on mostly American hits from the 1960s to the 1980s.
In March 2003, Vinyl FM was awarded "Radio Station of the year" by the Radio Awards jury.
Vinyl FM is only oldies station and one of the largest local stations in Stockholm.

In 1994 the ratings was 3.6%, today the ratings are 5% of the total Stockholm market

Radio stations in Sweden
Mass media in Stockholm
1994 establishments in Sweden